Dulbu is one of the Bantu languages of Nigeria. Speakers are shifting to Hausa.

References

Jarawan languages
Languages of Nigeria